Acceleware Ltd. (TSX-V: AXE) is a Canadian innovator of clean-tech oil and gas technologies composed of two business units: Radio Frequency (RF) Enhanced Oil Recovery and Seismic Imaging Software. The Company is currently running a commercial-scale, RF XL pilot project at Marwayne, Alberta, Canada, to advance and validate its heavy oil and oil sands electrification technology. Acceleware's seismic imaging software solutions offer imaging for oil exploration in complex geologies.

Acceleware is part of a larger computing industry trend towards parallel processing via multi-core and massively-parallel GPU hardware and software architectures.

Acceleware software can be used in the following industries: electromagnetics, oil and gas, medical imaging, security imaging, industrial product design, consumer product design, financial research, and academic research.

History 
Acceleware was founded in 2004, in Calgary, Alberta, Canada. Extensive research on special-purpose hardware was conducted, and Acceleware developed competence-accelerating scientific computing software applications. Graphics processing units (GPUs) became the main hardware focus, as their parallel processing capabilities and extremely high memory bandwidth made them superior for accelerating scientific applications.

GPU Computing (using a graphics processing unit to compute mathematical algorithms), parallelizes complex tasks so that many equations may be calculated , at one time, as opposed to CPU computing which requires that these tasks be done in sequence. This parallelization results in a reduction of the time and costs required for highly complex and intensive simulations.

In January 2008, Acceleware entered into the seismic market, providing hardware acceleration for seismic migrations, a logical progression as they are based in Calgary, Alberta, Canada, one of the world's hubs for oil and gas activity.

In July 2008, market conditions and lack of available venture capital forced Acceleware to scale back its growth plans and reduce staff. Today, the company remains focused on the electromagnetics, seismic, and engineering simulation markets. It has also adopted a more software-oriented process now that GPU computing technology has become more accepted and generally available.

In October 2018, Acceleware entered into an agreement with AMD to provide them with Software Engineering Expertise and Consulting Services. 

In November 2019, Acceleware secured an investment from a Calgary-based oil sands producer for the RF XL pilot test of its radio frequency heating system.

During the COVID-19 pandemic, Acceleware participated in the Faster, Together campaign to increase acceptance of COVID-19 vaccines.

Milestones

2013 
  Acceleware Reaches Milestone with 100th HPC Programming Course

2012 
 Acceleware releases high-performance TTI AxRTM. A 2.5x improvement in speed over previous TTI AxRTM
 Acceleware introduces C++ AMP training courses in partnership with Microsoft
 Acceleware surpasses 90 training classes held, to over 1000 students

2010 
 Appointment of Geoff Clark as CEO
 Acceleware partners with Crosslight
 Acceleware partners with Paradigm

2009 
 Acceleware offers professional code-porting and training services

2008 
 July – Acceleware undergoes a management restructuring and a major downsizing due to poor market conditions
 March – Acceleware enters the image reconstruction market
 January – Acceleware enters the seismic migration market

2007 
 January – Nvidia invests $3 million in Accelware

2006 
 January – Acceleware goes public on the TSX Venture Exchange (Symbol: AXE)

2005 
 Accelerator V1.0 is launched at IEEE MTT-S IMS for the electromagnetic simulation market

Acceleware Products 
Acceleware products are software libraries created to utilize the parallel processing capabilities of Nvidia GPUs to allow consumers to process difficult simulations, migrations, and other engineering tasks. They are offered as an SDK/API to software integrators or as a plug-in option to end users.

References 

Companies listed on the TSX Venture Exchange
Companies based in Calgary
GPGPU